The women's hammer throw event at the 2003 All-Africa Games was held on October 11.

Results

References

Hammer